The New Folk Sound of Terry Callier is the 1968 debut album from American folk and soul performer Terry Callier, released on Prestige Records. The album has received positive reviews from critics.

Recording and release
Callier started recording as a teenager for Chess Records in 1962 but did not record an album for the first two years he was a professional musician. The album was recorded by Samuel Charters, who courted Callier to come to Prestige in 1964 but after the sessions, he ran off to Mexico, delaying the actual album release from 1965 to 1968. Callier did not even know the album was released until his brother saw it for sale in a book store. Craft Recordings released a 50thanniversary edition on November 2, 2018.

Critical reception
The editorial staff of AllMusic Guide gave the release four out of five stars, with Jason Ankeny writing that the album is not Callier's best but "it's his most timeless and inviting". Remarking on the 50thanniversary edition, Charles Donovan of PopMatters calls the original "a terrific album" and the re-release "stunning".

Track listing
All songs are traditional compositions, except where noted
"900 Miles"– 5:05
"Oh Dear, What Can the Matter Be"– 2:50
"Johnny Be Gay If You Can Be"– 4:20
"Cotton Eyed Joe"– 5:25
"It's About Time" (Rent Foreman, Lydia Wood)– 3:25
"Promenade in Green"– 4:00
"Spin, Spin, Spin" (Foreman)– 3:05
"I'm a Drifter" (Travis Edmonson)– 8:50

2018 bonus tracks
"Jack O’Diamonds"
"Golden Apples of the Sun"
"Promenade in Green" (Take 1)
"Be My Woman" (Take 1)
"900 Miles" (Take 1)
"It’s About Time" (Take 2)
"Oh Dear, What Can the Matter Be" (Take 2)

Personnel
Terry Callier– guitar, vocals
Terbour Attenborough– upright bass
Paul Blakemore– mastering on anniversary edition
Samuel Charters– production
Ray Flerlage– photography
Rent Foreman– liner notes
Ryan Jebavy– editing on anniversary edition
Sage LaMonica– design on anniversary edition
Chris Popham– design
Don Schlitten– design
John Tweedle– upright bass
Jason P. Woodbury– liner notes in anniversary edition
Mason Williams– production on anniversary edition

References

External links

Entry at Rate Your Music

1968 debut albums
Albums produced by Samuel Charters
Prestige Records albums
Terry Callier albums